The following is a list of Rhode Island Rams football seasons.

This is a list of seasons completed by the Rhode Island Rams football team of the National Collegiate Athletic Association (NCAA) Division I Football Championship Subdivision (FCS).

Seasons

References

 
Rhode Island
Rhode Island Rams football seasons